Kampong Telanai is a village in Brunei-Muara District, Brunei, as well as a neighbourhood in the capital Bandar Seri Begawan. The population was 1,228 in 2016. It is one of the villages within Mukim Kilanas. The postcode is BA2312 or BF1020.

References 

Villages in Brunei-Muara District
Neighbourhoods in Bandar Seri Begawan